Hypatima ephippias is a moth in the family Gelechiidae. It was described by Edward Meyrick in 1937. It is found in southern India.

The larvae feed in the shoots of Tamarindus indica.

References

Hypatima
Taxa named by Edward Meyrick
Moths described in 1937